ATP synthase mitochondrial F1 complex assembly factor 1, also known as ATP11 homolog, is a protein that in humans is encoded by the ATPAF1 gene.

Function 

This gene encodes an assembly factor for the F(1) component of the mitochondrial ATP synthase. This protein binds specifically to the F1 beta subunit and is thought to prevent this subunit from forming nonproductive homooligomers during enzyme assembly. Alternatively spliced transcript variants have been identified, but the biological validity of some of these variants has not been determined.

References

External links

Further reading